Elliot (also spelled Eliot, Elliotte, Elliott, Eliott and Elyot) is a personal name which can serve as either a surname or a given name. Although the given name has historically been given to males, females have increasingly been given the name as well in the United States.

Surname origin
Differences in spelling can be distinguished in this rhyme:

The double L and single T / Descent from Minto and Wolflee, / The double T and single L / Mark the old race in Stobs that dwell. / The single L and single T / The Eliots of St Germans be, / But double T and double L, / Who they are nobody can tell.

Scotland
The origin of the Scottish surname is obscure, due to much of the genealogy of the Eliott clan being burnt in the destruction of the castle at Stobs in 1712. The clan society usually accepts that the name originated from the town and river Elliot in Angus, Scotland. Other sources claim that the Scottish surnames (Eliott, Elliot) originate from the Ellot Scottish border-clan, from a transformation of the name Elwold. Whatever their true origin, the Scottish Elliotts became notorious Border Reivers – cattle thieves – in the Scottish-English border area and a thorn in the side of both governments.

The whole subject of the Scottish name origin is discussed by Keith Elliot Hunter on the Elliot Clan website where he argues for a Breton origin to the name and the first chief being William d'Alyth. Under that name, the d'Alyths played a key role in the Scottish Wars of Independence. However, Mark Elliot presents a well-argued case that there is no connection between the Elliot river and town with the clan and believes the origins are in the first name of Elwald, which appears in Northumberland in the 8th century king, Elwald I. The name has Anglo-Saxon origins and appears alongside Armstrong in Northumbrian records dating from 1165. The first chief is claimed to be Robert Elwold (1305–67), who came from York, but migrated to the area around Hermitage Castle Robert Elwold of Redheuch is granted lands around Redheuch and Larriston in the 1484 Sasine deed Robert, 13th clan chief, who was killed at the Battle of Flodden is recorded with the surname 'Elwold'.

The original Anglo-Saxon surnames from Northumbria like Aelwold, Ellwald, Elaund, Elwaird, Elwods, Alwods, Elyards, Halwads seem to have mixed together eventually as Ellot. Sir Arthur and the Dowager Lady Eliott maintained that the family were originally known as Ellots. Lady Elliot in The Elliots: The Story of a Border Clan says: "Around 1650 someone added an 'I' to our name to make it Elliot, which was without a doubt unfortunate as it confuses the clan with a well-known English Norman family called Eliot who settled in West England". That would exclude the idea that the Cornish Eliots set the clan up a few centuries earlier, but it is said that this was some means of expressing solidarity with John Eliot, who was regularly imprisoned by Charles I until his death in 1632.

A Thomas Elyot is recorded in West Lothian, dying in 1505.

Southeast England
The origin of the east English name is in Cambridgeshire. The first recorded sign of the name relates to Henry Elyot at the Priory of St Mary and St. Radegund in Cambridge in about 1180. An Elyat (or Elyot) is in Bury St. Edmunds in 1188. By 1220, Elyot is well-established in Cambridge in Great St Andrew's Parish where a William Elyot appears. A William Eliot appears in about 1270 in the same parish.

The surname reaches London early in the 14th century. Johanne Eliot appears in the 1319 Portsoken (near Aldgate) Subsidy Roll of 1319 with a reference to him being found in 1311 under John Elyot. In the Museum of London is "a bronze jug with three feet and three bands of lettering around the neck and body. The neck is straight with a pointed spout. The body is fat and bulbous. This fine bronze jug is inscribed: "+THOMAS:E[L]YOT/ +HI RECOMAND ME TO EU/ +WYLLEAM:ELYOT" ". William Elyot of Cheshunt (north of London) received land at Kingston upon Thames (south-west London) in 1343: Grant by John, son of John Donnyng of Kyngeston, to William Elyot, of Chestehunte, of a grange and land in Kyngeston. Thursday, the feast of St. Edmund the King. 17 Edward III."

The surname first appears in Sussex in the 14th century as Godefro Elyot at Thakham and William Elyot in Grinstead are listed in the Subsidy Rolls of 1327 & 1332. A Stephen Elyot is recorded in September 1364 as a "vintner of Rye" in east Sussex and later became its MP in 1377.

William Elyot was Constable of Horsham in 1401 and his grandson, Thomas Elyot (1420–67) a Filacer (issuer of the Royal Writs) is buried at Wonersh church in Surrey, not far north of Horsham. It is from him that the Elliots of Godalming descend with their arms being Azure with a fess or (blue with a gold strip across the centre). The Surrey Elyots changed to Eliott in about 1500 and then changed to Elliott during the 1700s (see Elliott v Davenport 1705, a famous legal case about Wills brought by the main family) and settled on it by the end of the 18th century.

It is not made easier by a member of the clan Eliott Stobs family, George Augustus Eliott, (1717–1790), the defender of Gibraltar, being made 1st Baron Heathfield, which is in Sussex, although he died childless.

Southwest England

The name in the West Country derives from the Eliot family (South England) of Cornwall at Port Eliot/St. Germans, who claim descent from a Norman knight, Sir William de Aliot. It is unknown exactly when the Eliots settled in Devon, but it is estimated they prospered there for 8 to 10 generations before moving to St. Germans. The earliest record is of a William Elyot, who appears in the Somerset Assizes rolls in 1257 and there is a record of the surname in an indenture signed in 1400 by RYC Elyot.

France
The name Eliot appears in Normandy in 1195 and a son of Anschar Elyot in 1198.

It has been argued by Keith Elliott Hunter that the origins of the St. Germans Eliot family were among the Bretons accompanying William the Conqueror, who were originally rewarded with lands in Devon. The Breton origin of Eliot and Elliot is indicated by these names being in significant clusters in Morbihan, southern Brittany. Soon after victory at the Battle of Hastings Elliots, under Count Brien of Penthievre (Morbihan), were despatched to the West Country. Other Eliots were sent later to Monmouthshire in South Wales and to the marcher counties, where significant clusters of the name can be found today. Bretons also settled in the north, as vassals of the Breton Earl of Richmond, Alan of Penthievre.

Large surviving clusters of Eliots in Normandy (Seine Maritime) today could be due to later grants of land. The Alliots, found also in Southern Brittany and the Loire Atlantique, had lands in the modern French departement of Aisne. One variant in Scotland was Dalliot (or, more likely, d'Alliot) and a variation from the Breton original name Ellegouet, from which the Scots variant Elligott is derived, is to be found in clusters in Finistere. Elot is also a Breton name variant.

Northern Ireland
Robert Bell in The Book of Scots-Irish Family Names adds: "For double L and double T, / the Scots should look across the sea!" He pointed out that 71 of 76 births of children by that name in Ireland in 1890 spelt it "Elliott". Elliot(t)s emigrated or were sent to north Ireland in the early 17th century after the Border area was pacified, following the union of the English and Scottish crowns in 1603. Many settled in county Fermanagh.

DNA
The Elliot Clan Society has an extensive list of DNA results which point to native Celtic origins for the clan. However, the three contributions from Sussex do suggest both a native origin in the area and the unusual J haplotype from southern Europe. There are also suggestions of French DNA from the Surrey Elliotts.

Surname myths
Some sources claim it may be derived from a French form of Elias, which is itself derived from the biblical name "Elijah".

Legend also has it that the extra "t" in Eliott arose when a branch of the Eliotts adopted Christianity.

It is claimed that the surname originated in the early 13th century as "Eliot", as there is supposed to be a reference to "Geoffrey Eliot", Abbot of Hyde, in documents linked to the creation of Magna Carta. However, the Abbot of Hyde Abbey (near Winchester in Hampshire), who signed the 1224 version was Abbot Aston and the 1297 version confirmed by Edward I mentions the Abbot of Hyde as a witness, but does not name him.

There are also records in the Domesday Book of the name spelled "Ailiet", thought to originate from an Old English name "Æþelgeat" (meaning "noble gate") and leading to the English and Scottish given name spelled "Elyat".

Extent of the surname
In England, the surname Elliott is well represented in Northumberland, County Durham, Derbyshire, Lancashire, Nottinghamshire and Yorkshire, and in the south, in Surrey, Sussex, London, Cambridgeshire and Cornwall. In Scotland, the surname is well represented in Lanarkshire, Angus, Roxburghshire, Dumfriesshire, and other border counties. In the United States the surname is well represented in Ohio, North Carolina, Michigan, Virginia, Kentucky, South Carolina, Alabama, New Hampshire and Delaware.

Notable bearers of the surname
Among the many famous people with this name are the authors T. S. Eliot and George Eliot (pseudonym of Mary Ann Evans). Jane Austen's last completed novel Persuasion includes characters belonging to the Elliot family of Kellynch Hall: Sir Walter Elliot, Bart., and his daughters, Anne and Elizabeth.

Eliot
 Lord Eliot or Baron Eliot, a title of the Earl of St Germans
Charles Eliot (diplomat) (1862–1931), British diplomat, colonial administrator and botanist
Charles William Eliot (1834–1926), American educator and President of Harvard University
Clara Eliot (1896 – 1976), American economist
Darren Eliot (born 1961), Canadian ice hockey player and sports broadcaster
George Eliot (1819–1880), English novelist – pseudonym of Mary Ann Evans
T. S. Eliot (1888–1965), British-American author
Eliot family (America), an influential American family
Eliot (born Mark Eliot), American singer, songwriter, and actor

Elliott
Aileen Mary Elliott (1896–1966), British artist
Alan Elliott (born 1972), British artist and musician 
Alex Elliott (born 1987), Canadian soccer player
Alex Elliott (footballer, born 1905) (1905–1988), Scottish footballer
Arthur Elliott (footballer) (born 1870), English footballer
 Barry Elliott (1944–2018) and Paul Elliott (born 1947), the Chuckle Brothers, British comedians
Bill Elliott (born 1955), American racing driver
Bob Elliott (disambiguation), multiple people
Bonnie Elliott, Australian cinematographer, on the film Slam (2018 film)
Brennan Elliott, Canadian actor
Brian Elliott, Canadian ice hockey goaltender
Brian Elliott (writer) (1910–1991), Australian literary academic
Bryan Elliott (1930–2015), English speedway rider
Bryn Elliott, English footballer
Bump Elliott (1925–2019), American college footballer, coach, and athletic director
Byron Elliott (1835–1913), American judge
C. Thomas Elliott, American semiconductor and infrared detector physicist
Casey Elliott, American racing driver
Charlotte Elliott, English poet
Charlotte Elliott (botanist), American scientist
Chase Elliott (born 1995), American racing driver; son of Bill Elliott
Chris Elliott, American actor
Dawn Elliott, American biomedical engineer
DeShon Elliott (born 1997), American football player
Daniel Elliott (disambiguation), multiple people
Della Elliott (1917–2011), Australian trade unionist
Denholm Elliott (1922–1992), British actor
Ebenezer Elliott (1781–1849), English poet
Edwin Bailey Elliott, English mathematician
Ezekiel Elliott, American football player
Fiona Smith (Elliott), English badminton medalist
Francis Elliott (archdeacon), Archdeacon of Berbice from 1908 to 1911
Francis Elliott (journalist), British journalist
Fred Elliott, (1903–1982), Canadian ice hockey player (1917 Ottawa Senators)
Grant Elliott (born 1979), New Zealand cricketer
Granville Elliott (1713–1759), British army general
Harry Elliott (disambiguation), multiple people
Harvey Elliott (born 2003), English footballer
Henry Wood Elliott, American environmentalist
Henry Wood Elliott II (1920–1876), American physician
Herb Elliott, champion Australian middle distance runner
Herbert Elliott (1877–1973), English cricketer
Hugh Elliott (disambiguation), several people
Sir Hugh Elliott, 3rd Baronet (1913–1989), British conservationist and ornithologist
Hugh Elliott (diplomat), British diplomat and ambassador
Ivan A. Elliott, American politician
Jack Elliott (rugby union) (1871–1938), Wales international rugby player
Jake Elliott (born 1995), American football player
Jalen Elliott (born 1998), American football player
James William Elliott (1833–1915), composer and collector of nursery-rhymes
Jane Elliott, American teacher and anti-racism activist
Jane Elliott (academic), British sociologist
Jayrone Elliott (born 1991), American football player
Jehu Elliott (1813–1876), Justice of the Indiana Supreme Court
Jerritt Elliott (born 1968), American volleyball coach
Joanne Elliott (born 1925), American mathematician
Joe Elliott, lead singer for the band Def Leppard
John Elliott (disambiguation), several people
John Elliott (actor) (1876–1956), American actor
 John Elliott (artist) (1858–1925), English artist
 John Elliott (architect) (1936–2010), English architect
 John Elliott (British boxer) (1901–1945), British boxer of the 1920s
 John Elliott (businessman) (1941–2021), Australian businessman and prominent Liberal
 John Elliott (cricketer) (born 1942), English cricketer
 John Elliott (defensive lineman) (1944–2010), American football defensive tackle
 John Elliott (electronic musician) (born 1984), American electronic musician
 John Elliott (Georgia politician) (1773–1827), U.S. Senator from Georgia
 John Elliott (golfer) (born 1963), American professional golfer
 John Elliott (historian) (1930–2022), British historian
 John Elliott (Jamaican boxer) (1931–2015), Jamaican boxer
 John Elliott (New Zealand politician) (born 1938), New Zealand politician
 John Elliott (physician) (fl. 1690), adherent of James II
 John Elliott (wrestler) (born 1934), Australian Olympic wrestler
 John Banks Elliott (1917–2018), Ghana's ambassador to the USSR
 John C. Elliott (1919–2001), Governor of American Samoa
 John Campbell Elliott (1872–1941), Canadian lawyer and politician
 John F. Elliott (1920–1991), American professor of metallurgy
 John H. Elliott (biblical scholar) (1935–2020), New Testament scholar
 John M. Elliott Jr. (active since 1970), makeup artist
 John Milton Elliott (1820–1879), legislator from Kentucky
 John S. Elliott (1889–1950), American football coach
Jordan Elliott (born 1997), American football player
Jumbo Elliott (American football) (John Elliott, born 1965)
Keith Elliott (1916–1989), New Zealand Victoria Cross recipient
Lillian Wolock Elliott (1930–1994), American textile designer.
Lloyd Hartman Elliott (1918–2013), American academic
Marianne Elliott (historian) (1948-), British historian of Ireland
Marianne Elliott (director) (1966-), British theatrical director
Marianne Joan Elliott-Said, as Poly Styrene, (1957–2011), British musician
Martin Elliott (photographer) (1946–2010), British photographer
Michele Elliott, British author, psychologist, founded child protection charity Kidscape
Missy Elliott, American hip hop singer
Peter Elliott (disambiguation), multiple people
Pierre Elliott Trudeau, Pierre Trudeau Prime Minister of Canada
Ralph Elliott (1921–2012), German-born Australian professor of English, runologist
Ralph Nelson Elliott, American accountant who developed the Wave Principle
Robert Elliott (disambiguation), multiple people
Robert G. Elliott, executioner
Roger Elliott (1665–1714), British army general
Roger James Elliott (1928–2018), British physicist
Sam Elliott, American actor
Sean Elliott (born 1968), American basketball player and sportscaster
Shayne Elliott (born 1963/64), New Zealand banker
Sophie Elliott, New Zealand murder victim
Stefan Elliott, Canadian hockey player
Stephen Elliott (disambiguation),multiple people
Susan J. Elliott, American psychologist
Susan M. Elliott, American diplomat
Susan Elliott (academic), Australian academic
Ted Elliott (disambiguation), multiple people
Tony Elliott (disambiguation), multiple people
Trevor Elliott (1937-), Australian Rules footballer
Trevor Elliott (geoscientist) (1949–2013), British geologist
Wade Elliott, British football player
Will Elliott, Australian author

Eliott
 Lord Eliott, a title of the Eliott baronets Baronets of Stobs
George Augustus Eliott, 1st Baron Heathfield (1717–1790), defender of Gibraltar

Elliot
Adam Elliot (born 1972), Australian animator
Alistair Elliot (1932–2018), British poet and translator
 Lord Elliot – a title of the Earl of Minto
 Little Jock Elliot, Scottish border ballad
Carma Elliot (Caroline Margaret Elliot, born 1964), British diplomat
 (Mama) Cass Elliot (1941–1974), American singer
Charles Elliot (1801–1875), British diplomat
Daniel Giraud Elliot (1835–1915), American zoologist
 Sir Edmund Elliot (1854–1926), British Army officer
Edward Hay Mackenzie Elliot (1852–1921), Scottish footballer
 Sir Edward Locke Elliot (1850–1938), British Army officer in India
 Sir Francis Elliot (1851–1940), British diplomat, envoy to Greece
George Elliot (disambiguation)
Helen Elliot (1927–2013), Scottish table tennis player
Henry Miers Elliot (1808–1853), English civil servant and historian in India
Jane Evans Elliot (1820–1886), American Civil War memoirist
Jim Elliot (1927–1956), American missionary
Justine Elliot (born 1967), Australian politician
Lady Charlotte Elliot (1839–1880), Scottish poet
Robert Elliot (disambiguation), several people
Robert Henry Elliot (1837–1914), Scottish agriculturalist
Walter Elliot (disambiguation)
Win Elliot (1915–1998), American sportscaster

Elyot
Kevin Elyot (1951–2014), British playwright, screenwriter and actor
Thomas Elyot (1490–1546), British diplomat and scholar

Given name
Elliot Abravanel, American physician and diet counselor
Elliot Anderson (politician), American politician and a Democratic member of the Nevada Assembly
Elliot Aronson, American psychologist
Elliot Balchin, actor in various British television series
Elliott Belgrave, Barbadian citizen and retired High Court Judge
Elliot Benchetrit, French tennis player
Elliot Benyon, English footballer
Elliot Bigelow, right fielder in Major League Baseball
Elliot Brown (actor), English actor
Elliot Bunney, Scottish athlete
Elliot Caplin (1913–2000), American comic strip writer
Elliott Carter, American composer
Elliot Chorley, former Canadian ice hockey right winger
Elliott J. Clawson (1883–1942), American screenwriter
Eliot A. Cohen, (born 1956) American political scientist
Elliot E. Cohen (1899–1959), founder-editor of Commentary Magazine
Elliott Colla, American scholar of the Middle East
Elliot Cowan, English actor
Elliott Daingerfield (1859–1932), American artist
Elliot Daly, English rugby union footballer
Elliot Davis (composer), British composer, musician and music documentary maker
Elliot Davis (cinematographer) (born 1948), American cinematographer
Elliot Dee, Welsh rugby union player
Elliot del Borgo (1938–2013), American composer for winds and strings
Elliot Dixon, professional rugby union player
Elliot N. Dorff, Conservative rabbi
Elliot Easton, lead guitarist for The Cars
Elliot Eisner, American educational theorist and art educator
Eliot Engel, US Representative for New York's 16th congressional district
Elliott Erwitt, advertising and documentary photographer
Elliot Evans, English teen pop singer
Elliott Ferrous-Martin Platt (born 2004), known as ElyOtto, Canadian musician
Elliot Fletcher, American actor and musician
Elliott Fry (born 1994), American football player
Elliot Gleave, British singer/rapper
Elliot Goldenthal, American composer
Elliott Gould, American actor
 Elliott Hanna, English dancer and actor, played Billy Elliott in Billy Elliot the Musical Live
Elliott Hundley (born 1975), American artist
Elliot Levine, (born 1963), American jazz keyboardist
Elliott Maddox (born 1947), American major league baseball player
Elliot McAdam, former Australian politician
Elliott Miles McKinley (born 1969), American composer
Elliott Waters Montroll (1916–1983), American scientist and mathematician
Elliott Murphy (born 1949), American singer-songwriter and novelist
Eliot Ness (1903–1957), American prohibition agent
Elliot Page, Canadian actor and producer 
Elliot Pennington, American figure skater
Elliot Richardson, American politician
Elliot Rodger, American college student, who perpetrated the 2014 Isla Vista massacre
Elliott Sadler, American racing driver
Elliot Simmons (born 1998), English footballer
Elliott Smith (1969–2003), American singer-songwriter
Eliot Spitzer, American politician
Elliot Steinmetz (born 1980), American basketball coach 
Eliot Teltscher (born 1959), American professional tennis player
Eliot Vassamillet (born 2000), represented Belgium at the Eurovision Song Contest 2019
Elliott Whitehouse (born 1993), English footballer
Elliot Welles (born 1927), directed the B'nai B'rith Anti-Defamation League's task force on Nazi war criminals
Elliott Yamin, American singer and former American Idol participant

Fictional characters
Eliot Rosewater, in the Kurt Vonnegut novel, God Bless You, Mr. Rosewater
 Eliot Spencer, from Leverage (American TV series)
 Eliot Waugh, main character in The Magicians (Grossman novel) by Lev Grossman
 Elliot Alderson, lead character in the Mr. Robot television series
 Elliot Blitzer, character in the film True Romance
 Elliot Carver, antagonist in the film Tomorrow Never Dies
 Elliot Edwards, one of two protagonists in the Sega Saturn video game Nights into Dreams
Elliot Gordon, character in the webcomic Questionable Content
Elliot Reid, female character in Scrubs TV series
 Elliot Richards, protagonist in the remake Bedazzled (2000 film)
 Elliot Salem, one of two protagonists later turned antagonist in the video game series Army of Two
 Elliot Schafer, protagonist of In Other Lands by Sarah Rees Brennan
Elliot Stabler, senior detective from Law & Order: Special Victims Unit and Law & Order: Organized Crime portrayed by Christopher Meloni
 Elliot Vaughn, antagonist in the film Vertical Limit
 Elliott, character in the 2004 remake Flight of the Phoenix (2004 film)
 Elliott, the dragon in the 1977 Disney film Pete's Dragon and its remake Pete's Dragon (2016 film)
 Elliott Spencer, former name of the antagonist in the Hellraiser (franchise) films
 Elliott Taylor, male main character in the film E.T. the Extra-Terrestrial
 Elliott Templeton, character in The Razor's Edge by W. Somerset Maugham
 Elliott Rodger Witt, also known as Mirage, playable character in Apex Legends.
 Elyot Chase, lead character in Private Lives by Noël Coward
 Elliot Ludwig, character from Poppy Playtime
 Elliott (no surname provided), non-playable character from Stardew Valley

References

English-language surnames
Scottish surnames
English masculine given names
English-language unisex given names
Surnames from given names